The 1996 United States Senate election in Mississippi was held on November 5, 1996. Incumbent Republican U.S. Senator Thad Cochran won re-election to a fourth term.

Major candidates

Democratic 
 Bootie Hunt, retired factory worker
 Shawn O'Hara

Republican 
 Thad Cochran, incumbent U.S. Senator

Results

See also 
 1996 United States Senate elections

References 

Mississippi
1996
1996 Mississippi elections